Karama is a northern suburb of Darwin, Northern Territory, Australia.

History
The suburb of Karama is named after an Aboriginal tribe. 

Karama is an established residential area in Darwin's northern suburbs built in the period from the late 1970s to the early 1980s.

The suburb is predominantly made up of residents of low socioeconomic status, with many homes being government housing. 

In 1964, Douglas Lockwood recommended that a number of tribal names be used for the suburbs of Darwin. The suburbs Karama was listed.

Present day
Some major features of the area include the Karama Primary School, Manunda Terrace Primary School, Holy Family Primary School, O'Loughlin Secondary College and Karama Shopping Plaza.

Karama Library is also located within the Karama Shopping Plaza, and is a service of Darwin City Council Libraries.

Brazil Crescent in Karama was named after Robert Brazil, a crewman (fireman) on the ill-fated SS Gothenburg, which sank off the north Queensland coast on 24 February 1875, with the loss of approximately 102 lives. Brazil was one of only 22 survivors and was awarded a medal for bravery and heroism for his efforts to save drowning passengers.

Crime
Karama is a crime-ridden suburb. It is well known as one of Darwin's hotspots for property crime, crimes against the person and public order offences.

Recent examples
3 March 2021: A 17-year-old male was stabbed by a 19-year-old male in the lower back. The victim was located by police with a 15-inch knife blade lodged in his back. 
2 April 2021: A business inside Karama Shopping Plaza had to close their doors after a group of youths frightened staff members.
26 May 2021: A 20-year-old man died and a woman was seriously injured following two stabbing incidents in Karama. 
31 October 2021: Two men were hospitalised after being attacked with pipes and edged weapons in Karama during a brawl. One man was charged with attemped murder over the incident, along with two others. 
16 January 2022: A woman in her 40s was found dead at a bush camp in Karama. Police treated the death as suspicious. 
5 June 2022: NT Police pursued a stolen vehicle to Karama where they deployed a tyre deflation device, arresting four youths aged between 12 and 15 at the scene.
15 October 2022: Domestic assault - the victim was holding her two-year-old child when her partner allegedly assaulted her, causing her to fall to the ground and lose consciousness. The man continued to assault the woman before a witness intervened.
25 November 2022: A security guard at Karama Shopping Plaza was assaulted by an 18-year-old man with an edged weapon. 
3 December 2022: A group of youths stole a number of cigarette packets at a Karama shop before stealing a Toyota Yaris from it's owner with violence. The vehicle was used to commit a number of other offences in the Darwin area.

Residents become incensed
In June 2022 Karama residents began a change.org petition seeking a permanent police presence at Karama Shopping Plaza to mitigate the escalating crime and anti-social behaviour in the area, citing: 

I live in Karama. I have kids in middle school and high school. I work and so they need to catch bus to and from school. I'm terrified every day that something may happen to them whilst walking home from bus stops. They have to get off 2kms from home and walk rest of the way because I won't let them any where near Karama shopping complex. Something needs to be done about the crime in our suburb NOW- Sarah Grego, 9 June 2022

Because it is impossible to go shopping without been asked for money or cigarettes. I witnessed youths running in and out of supermarket stealing and pushing shoppers. Really is a bad experience.- Iurdes Pires, 6 June 2022

I’ve lived in Karama for nearly 40 years. It’s sad to watch it turn from such a great place to live and grow up, to a literal war zone! The shops are a mess. There’s drunks and fights everywhere. The kids can’t play in the parks because of the drunken ‘visitors’- Raquel Timney, 8 June 2022

In October that year however these calls were rejected by the Fyles Government with the Police Minister describing the proposal as ‘Uneconomical and ineffective’.

References

External links

 https://web.archive.org/web/20110629040718/http://www.nt.gov.au/lands/lis/placenames/origins/greaterdarwin.shtml#letter_h#k#k
 https://web.archive.org/web/20080116181605/http://203.84.234.220/Profile/Darwin/Default.aspx?id=146

Suburbs of Darwin, Northern Territory